Christopher Mann (born 14 April 1981) is an English cricketer.  Mann is a right-handed batsman who bowls right-arm medium pace.  He was born in South Shields, Tyne and Wear.

Mann represented the Durham Cricket Board in a single List A match against Buckinghamshire in the 2nd round of the 2002 Cheltenham & Gloucester Trophy which was played in 2001.  In his only List A match, he scored 7 runs and took a single catch in the field.

References

External links
Christopher Mann at Cricinfo
Christopher Mann at CricketArchive

1981 births
Living people
Cricketers from South Shields
English cricketers
Durham Cricket Board cricketers